Taylor Gardner-Hickman (born 30 December 2001) is an English footballer who plays as a defender for  club West Bromwich Albion.

Early and personal life
Gardner-Hickman was born in Telford. He is of Irish descent through his great-grandparents.

Club career

West Bromwich Albion
Having joined West Bromwich Albion's academy aged 7, Gardner-Hickman progressed through the club's youth academy. Gardner-Hickman made three appearances for the club's under-21 side in the 2020–21 EFL Trophy, scoring one goal. He was named in a West Bromwich Albion matchday squad for the first time on 9 May 2021 for a 3–1 defeat to Arsenal. He made his debut for the club on 25 August 2021, starting in a 6–0 EFL Cup second round defeat to Arsenal. He made his league debut for the club on 3 November 2021, starting at right wing-back as a replacement for the suspended Darnell Furlong in a 1–0 win over Hull City. On 30 December 2021, Gardner-Hickman signed a new four-and-a-half-year deal, keeping him at the club until 2026. Gardner-Hickman scored his first senior goal on 15 October 2022 in a 2-0 win at Reading.

International career
On 25 March 2022, Gardner-Hickman made his England U20 debut in a 2-0 defeat to Poland in Bielsko-Biała.

Style of play
Gardner-Hickman is primarily a right-sided player and is capable of playing at full-back, as a wide midfielder or in central midfield. In March 2022, manager Steve Bruce stated that he "believes his best position is right-back".

Career statistics

References

External links

Living people
2001 births
English footballers
Association football forwards
West Bromwich Albion F.C. players
English Football League players